Ignacio Bailone (born January 20, 1994, in Rosario) is an Argentine footballer who plays as a forward for San Antonio FC in the USL Championship. He made his professional debut for Club Atlético Lanús on October 13, 2013, against Godoy Cruz Antonio Tomba in Argentina.

Career

Childhood
Ignacio Bailone was born on January 20, 1994, in the city of Rosario. He started very young in the Club Deportivo Norte city of Mar del Plata, which already insinuated his footballing virtues as a forward scorer . Then he entered the Club Cadets of San Martin  of that city, repeating an excellent performance.

In 2007, he went on to wear the shirt Quilmes Athletic Club of Mar del Plata .

Quilmes Athletic Club of Mar del Plata 

His time at the club was extremely successful since for 4 consecutive years was Marplatense League scorer of the different categories in which he participated. His good performance led him to join in 2010, the Pre-selected Argentine U-17, directed by Pablo Cavallero .

Among the most significant achievements wearing the jersey, are:

 Champion of League Marplatense, Division 6 (Top scorer with 27 goals, 2010)
 Champion of League Marplatense, Division 7 (Top scorer with 23 goals, 2009)
 Second Position on the League Marplatense, Division 8 (Top scorer with 22 goals, 2008)

In 2010, he debuted in the first division of soccer marplatense against Talleres of Mar del Plata.

Club Atlético Lanús 

In 2010, he signed a contract with Club Atlético Lanús, which allowed him to stand out as a scorer, with 11 goals, in the fifth division of AFA. The same year he was summoned to play the Reserve Tournament against Club Atlético Newell's Old Boys. Same was played in the city of Rosario and ended 1 to 1. "Nacho" started on the eleven and he scored.

In 2011 played in Fourth Division and Reserve AFA. After good performances and goals scored, Guillermo Barros Schelotto and his twin brother, Gustavo Barros Schelotto, he was summoned to participate in the concentration of First Division.

On October 13, 2013, Ignacio debuted in the First Division of AFA against Godoy Cruz Antonio Tomba, playing 15 minutes.

Estudiantes de La Plata

In the month of August 2016, he signs his relationship with the club platense for two seasons.
On August 28 of the same year, he made his debut at Estudiantes de La Plata for the first date of the 2016–17 Primera Championship against Tigre Athletic Club as a visitor.
In the last play of the first half, Bailone converted his first goal to find a ball that leaked in an area and started in a free kick from the left run by Lucas Diarte.
Author of the first goal and the assists of the two remaining goals, marked by Lucas Rodriguez and Israel Damonte, was the highest point of the Pincha.
The match ended with victory of the team of La Platapor 3 to 0.
In his second match, against Club Atlético Sarmiento, scored the only goal of the victory head before the 10 'of the first half.

Quilmes Atlético Club

The April 21, 2017, was incorporated like reinforcement to loan by 2 months, by Quilmes, to maintain the category.

Instituto 

In September 2017, after extending the link with Estudiantes de La Plata until June 2019, he was loaned for a season to "La Gloria" from Córdoba. He played 19 games in the season.

Gymnasia de Jujuy 

In August 2018, he joined the ‘Lobo’ Jujuy.  He terminates the contract that linked him to Estudiantes de La Plata, and signs for 1 year, at Club Atlético Gimnasia y Esgrima (Jujuy), with a purchase option of 50% pass.
In the "wolf" he played 17 games and scored 3 goals.

Chacarita Juniors 

On July 3, 2019, he signs a contract with Chacarita for one season, with a purchase option of 50% of the pass.

San Antonio FC 

Having the possibility of emigrating to American football, he decided to terminate the contract with Chacarita Juniors and sign with the company Spurs Sports & Entertainment, which owns a football team participating in the USL Championship called San Antonio FC, a one-season contract.

HNK Šibenik 

After a good time in American football, starting in 2021, he signs a contract with Šibenik of the Croatian First League with a period of one and a half years.

Clubs

Career statistics

External links 
 Ignacio Bailone at Transfermarket
 

Argentine footballers
Argentine people of Italian descent
1994 births
Living people
Association football forwards
Quilmes Atlético Club footballers
Club Atlético Lanús footballers
Estudiantes de La Plata footballers
Instituto footballers
Gimnasia y Esgrima de Jujuy footballers
Chacarita Juniors footballers
Argentine Primera División players
Primera Nacional players
San Antonio FC players
Footballers from Rosario, Santa Fe